2014 Montedio Yamagata season.

J2 League

References

External links
 J.League official site

Montedio Yamagata
Montedio Yamagata seasons